Kalateh-ye Sanam (also Romanized as Kalāteh-ye Şanam and Kalāteh Şanam; also known as Kalāteh-ye Nūr Moḩammad Shādī) is a village in Gol Banu Rural District, Pain Jam District, Torbat-e Jam County, Razavi Khorasan Province, Iran. At the 2006 census, its population was 126, in 32 families.

References 

Populated places in Torbat-e Jam County